Neutral Bay was an electoral district of the Legislative Assembly in the Australian state of New South Wales, created in 1927, replacing part of the multi-member electorate of North Shore, and named after and including the Sydney suburb of Neutral Bay. It was abolished in 1962 and partly replaced by Kirribilli.

Members for Neutral Bay

Election results

References

Former electoral districts of New South Wales
1927 establishments in Australia
Constituencies established in 1927
1962 disestablishments in Australia
Constituencies disestablished in 1962